There are separatist movements in Pakistan which are based on ethnic and regional nationalism, including independence movements. The government of Pakistan has attempted to subdue these separatist movements.

The separatist movement in Balochistan is engaged in a low-intensity insurgency against the Government of Pakistan.

In 2009, the Pew Research Center conducted a Global Attitudes survey across Pakistan, in which it questioned respondents whether they viewed their primary identity as Pakistani or that of their ethnicity. The sample covered an area representing 90% of the adult population, and included all major ethnic groups. According to the findings, 96% of Punjabis identified themselves first as Pakistanis, as did 92% each of Pashtuns and Muhajirs; 55% of Sindhis chose a Pakistani identification, while 28% chose Sindhi and 16% selected "both equally"; whereas 58% of Baloch respondents chose Pakistani and 32% selected their ethnicity and 10% chose both equally. Collectively, 89% of the sample opted their primary identity as Pakistani. Similarly in 2010, Chatham House conducted an opinion poll in the Pakistani and Indian-administered regions of Kashmir asking respondents if they favoured independence or an accession to either countries; in Azad Kashmir controlled by Pakistan, 50% of respondents voted to join Pakistan, 44% voted for independence, and only 1% voted for accession to India. In the northern region of Gilgit-Baltistan, longstanding local sentiments oppose any merger of the area with Kashmir, and instead demand a constitutional integration with Pakistan.

Bangladesh

Pakistan was established in 1947, from the partition, as a state for Muslims. Its formation was based on the basis of Islamic nationalism.

As part of the Partition of India in 1947, Bengal was partitioned between the Dominion of India and the Dominion of Pakistan. The Pakistani part of Bengal was known as East Bengal until 1955 and thereafter as East-Pakistan following the implementation of the One Unit program. However, rampant corruption within the ranks of the Pakistani government and bureaucracy, economic inequality between the country's two wings caused mainly by a lack of representative government and the government's indifference to the efforts of fierce ethno-nationalistic politicians, like Sheik Mujibur Rahman from East Pakistan, who fought for Bangladeshi independence, resulted in civil war in Pakistan and subsequent separation of East Pakistan as the People's Republic of Bangladesh. Bilateral relations between the two wings grew strained over the lack of official recognition for the Bengali language, democracy, regional autonomy, disparity between the two wings, ethnic discrimination, and the central government's weak and inefficient relief efforts after the 1970 Bhola cyclone, which had affected millions in East Pakistan. These grievances led to several political agitations in East Bengal and ultimately a fight for full independence, which was made possible with the assistance of the Indian military.

Balochistan 

The Baloch Liberation Front (BLF) separatist group was founded by Jumma Khan Marri in 1964 in Damascus, and played an important role in the 1968-1980 insurgency in Pakistani Balochistan and Iranian Balochistan. Mir Hazar Ramkhani, the father of Jumma Khan Marri, took over the group in the 1980s. The Balochistan Liberation Army (also Baloch Liberation Army or Baluchistan Liberation army) (BLA) is a Baloch nationalist militant secessionist organization. However, Jumma Khan Marri ended his opposition and pledged allegiance to Pakistan on 17 February 2018. The stated goals of the organization include the establishment of an independent state of Balochistan separate from Pakistan and Iran. The name Baloch Liberation Army first became public in summer 2000, after the organization claimed credit for a series of bomb attacks in markets and railways lines. The BLA has also claimed responsibility for the systematic ethnic genocide of Punjabis, Pashtuns and Sindhis in Balochistan (about 25,000 as of July 2010) as well as blowing up of gas pipelines. Local Balochs have also been targeted by the separatist groups in the province. Brahamdagh Khan Bugti, alleged leader of Baloch Liberation Army (BLA), also asked separatists to conduct ethnic cleansing of Non-Baloch citizens from the province. In 2006, the BLA was declared to be a terrorist organization by the Pakistani and British governments.

However, the insurgency led by the Baloch separatists in the province is on its last leg. Baloch separatists have been losing their leaders and they have been unable to fill their ranks. There is also currently ongoing infighting between the different insurgents groups. The last insurgent leader, Balach Marri, was able to keep the different insurgent groups united. However, after his death in Afghanistan, infighting broke out between various insurgent groups. The insurgents were unable to replace him. Similarly, Baloch separatist follow Marxism. However, the Marxism ideology died across the world and there is no other ideologies to succeed it. So the founding father of Baloch separatist are dead. Moreover, attacks on pro-government leaders and politicians who are willing to take part in election has also contributed to the decline in separatist appeal.

The News International reported in 2012 that a Gallup survey conducted for DFID revealed that the majority of Baloch do not support independence from Pakistan. Only 37 percent of Baloch were in favour of independence. Amongst Balochistan's Pashtun population support for independence was even lower at 12 percent. However, a majority (67 percent) of Balochistan's population did favour greater provincial autonomy. Majority of Baloch also don't support separatist groups. They support political parties who use legislature to address their grievances. Experts also claim that most of the nationalists in the province had come to believe that they could fight for their political right within Pakistan.

As of 2018, the Pakistani state was using Islamist militants to crush Balochi separatists. Academics and journalists in the United States have allegedly been approached by Inter-Services Intelligence spies, who threatened them not to speak about the insurgency in Balochistan, as well as human rights abuses by the Pakistani Army, or else their families would be harmed.

Sindhudesh

Sindhudesh (literally "Sindhi Country") is an idea of a separate Homeland for Sindhis proposed by Sindhi nationalist parties for the creation of a Sindhi state, which would be independent from  Pakistan. The movement is based in the Sindh region of Pakistan and was conceived by the Sindhi political leader G. M. Syed. A Sindhi literary movement emerged in 1967 under the leadership of Syed and Pir Ali Mohammed Rashdi, in opposition to the One Unit policy, the imposition of Urdu by the central government and to the presence of a large number of Muhajir (Indian Muslim refugees) settled in the province.

However, neither the separatist party nor the nationalist party have ever been able to take centre stage in Sindh. Local Sindhis strongly support Pakistan People Party (PPP). The unparalleled and unhindered success of the PPP in Sindh shows the preference of Sindhis for a constitutional political process over a separatist agenda to resolve their grievances. Similarly public opinion is also not heavily in favour of these parties either. In other words, neither the Sindhi separatists nor the nationalists have significant popular support — certainly not the kind that will make them capable of fuelling a full-scale insurgency. Almost all of the Sindhis have a strong Pakistani identity and prefer to remain part of Pakistan.

In 2012, a Sindhudesh rally was organised by a nationalist party in Karachi, which had a notably low turnout. The nationalist party had claimed that they would gather around million people for their million march. Although, only 3,000 to 4,000 people attended the rally.

In 2020, the Pakistani government banned multiple separatist outfits including the Jeay Sindh Qaumi Mahaz - Aresar group, Sindhudesh Liberation Army, and Sindhudesh Revolutionary Army

Azad Kashmir and Gilgit-Baltistan

An independence movement currently exists in Gilgit-Baltistan (called "Balawaristan" by its supporters).  Balawaristan National Front (Hameed Group) (BNF-H) led by Abdul Hamid Khan were trying to seek independence of Gilgit-Baltistan from Pakistan. However, Abdul Hamid Khan unconditionally surrendered to Pakistan security officials on 8 February 2019 after being banned for having connections to Indian intelligence agencies. Following his surrender, 14 more members of BNF-H were arrested for their anti-Pakistani activities. Since then the fate of BNF-H is unknown. Another organisation by the name of Balawaristan National Front led by Nawaz Khan Naji seeks to declare Gilgit-Balistan an autonomous Region under Administration of Pakistan till Promised pelbicite.

In Pakistan administred Kashmir, no political parties with that do not agree with accession with Pakistan can contest elections. 
   
Sardar Arif Shahid, was a Kashmiri nationalist leader who advocated the independence of Kashmir from both India and Pakistan's rule. He was killed on May 14, 2013 outside his house in Rawalpindi. It was the first time any pro-independence Kashmiri leader was targeted in this way in Pakistan. His supporters allege that he was killed by Pakistan security forces. Within the area, "Custodial torture and intimidation of independence supporters and other activists" has occurred.

In 2010, Chatham House, a London based think tank, did a survey, sponsored by Saif al-Islam Gaddafi, in both Pakistani and Indian administered Kashmir. Based on a sample size of 3,774, it found that Kashmiri's on both sides wanted independence. The survey states, 44% of Kashmiri's in Pakistan administered Kashmir wanted independence.

In October 2019, the People National Alliance organised a rally to free Kashmir from Pakistani rule. As a result of the police trying to stop the rally, 100 people were injured.

Jinnahpur and Muhajir Sooba

Jinnahpur refers to an alleged plot in Pakistan to form a breakaway autonomous state to serve as a homeland for the Karachi based Urdu-speaking Muhajir community. Mohajirs are immigrants who came to Pakistan from India in the wake of the violence that followed the independence of India in 1947.  The alleged name to be given to the proposed breakaway state was "Jinnahpur", named after Mohammed Ali Jinnah. In 1992, the Pakistani military claimed it had found maps of the proposed Jinnahpur state in the offices of the Mohajir Qaumi Movement (now renamed Muttahida Qaumi Movement), despite the party's strong denial of the authenticity of the maps. Despite the party's strong commitment to the Pakistani state, at that time government of Nawaz Sharif chose to use it as the basis for the military operation against the MQM, known as Operation Clean-up.

The Muhajir Sooba (literally meaning 'Immigrant Province') is a political movement which seeks to represent the Muhajir people of Sindh. This concept floated as a political bargaining tool by the leader of Muttahida Qaumi Movement, Altaf Hussain for the creation of a Muhajir province for the Muhajir-majority areas of Sindh, which would be independent from Sindh government.

References

Further reading